Argonaut was a class of submarines built by engineer Simon Lake. When used without clarification Argonaut generally refers to the second-built and larger submarine launched in 1900 at Baltimore. She had a White and Middleton gas engine and propeller, dynamo, searchlight, and pumps for air and water. Her main attribute like that of the older sibling and predecessor  (1894); was a wet diving chamber that allowed a diver to leave and re-enter the submarine. Argonaut No 1, and Argonaut No 2 are used as the name of this vessel.

In September 1898 it made an open-ocean passage from Norfolk, Virginia, to Sandy Hook, New Jersey, becoming the first submarine to operate successfully in the open sea.

References

Further reading
 
 

19th-century submarines of the United States
Submarine classes